The Worldwide Communion of Catholic Apostolic Churches (WCCAC; , CICAM) was a communion of independent Catholic churches connected to the Brazilian Catholic Apostolic Church (ICAB). The Worldwide Communion of Catholic Apostolic Churches was founded around 2008 in Guatemala. In spite of its ambitious aims, there is no independent evidence of any recent activity of this organization, which seems to have stalled.

Organization and beliefs
The Worldwide Communion of Catholic Apostolic Churches adhered to a conventional Catholic Christian faith, though with openness to other beliefs that they perceive do not contradict the Catholic faith. Similarly, the WCCAC understanding of church structure and hierarchy, sacraments, and holy orders essentially did not differ from conventional Catholicism, but dissolution of marriage by a bishop was allowed. The founding bishops' statement added that "We do not accept any ordination of women into the Holy Orders (...). We do not allow any homosexual clergy in any communion churches." The Worldwide Communion of Catholic Apostolic Churches was intended to be governed by an International Bishops Council. For organizational purposes, the communion had a board of directors, an honorary advisory committee, and an executive secretariat. The International Bishops Council aimed to meet every two years. The council of the communion formed at San Lucas Sacatepéquez, Guatemala, August 12–18, 2008.

Member churches were formed in different countries, presided over by bishops. WCCAC members are thought to have included, or may currently include:

Argentina: Argentine Catholic Apostolic Church
Brazil: Brazilian Catholic Apostolic Church
Mexico: Mexican Catholic Apostolic Church
Venezuela: Venezuelan Catholic Apostolic Church

Inactivity
There is no independently verifiable evidence of significant activity of WCCAC in recent years, and it could be presumed to have terminated: "ICAB [WCCAC's mother church] has had difficulty in maintaining the unity and continuity of its worldwide communion of branches. (...) [The] priorities of each branch do not always seem to be in harmony (...) and it becomes difficult at times to see what the point of having an international communion is supposed to be. In ICAB’s defense, perhaps, it cannot be easy to hold breakaway groups in a communion, however loose a communion it may be – it is almost a direct contradiction in terms."

References

Independent Catholic denominations
Christian organizations established in 2008